Bolshaya Pokrovskaya Street (. Short-name - Pokrovka) is the high street in the historical centre of Nizhny Novgorod and one of its oldest streets. Until 1917 it was considered a street for noblemen. Formed as the main street of the city by the end of the 18th century. It is considered an analogue of the Arbat in Moscow or 6-7 Lines of Vasilyevsky Island in St. Petersburg.

History

Russian Empire 
The street began to form in the Middle Ages. Then its direction was set on the road to Moscow. After the visit of Empress Catherine II, a new regular city plan was developed, providing for a quarterly system. In 1823 - 1824 the bell tower at the church of the Protection of the Holy Virgin was built. Since then, the street has become known as the Bolshaya Pokrovskaya. Most often the street was called "Pokrovka".

At the end of the 16th to the beginning of the 19th centuries stone buildings were added to the street. Since then it has become the main street of the city and has become known as the "noble family", because of the location on it of the estate of the generals, princely families, the governor, the vice-governor and other high officials. In 1896 Nicholas Theater was built, the opening of which was timed to coincide with the beginning of the All-Russia Exhibition. On 18 July 1896, it was visited by Emperor Nicholas II. By the beginning of the 20th century buildings and streets heavily compacted and houses began to form a continuous line on both sides of the street. In 1913, the main state bank was built on the street. Its opening was timed to the Romanov Tercentenary.

Soviet period 
After the revolution, the street was renamed and began to bear the name of the revolutionary Yakov Sverdlov and was popularly called "Sverdlovka". Approximately in 1935, the Church of the Intercession was demolished. Until the 1980s, the street was a road and in the early 80's it was made pedestrian.

Current Russia 
After the dissolution of the Soviet Union, the street was renamed back to Bolshaya Pokrovskaya. In 2004 the 21st century the street was completely reconstructed. It was paved with paving stones, and bronze sculptures were installed along both sides. The most popular are the sculpture "The Funny goat", in front of the Dramatic Theater, and the sculpture of the policeman, on the Minin and Pozharsky Square.

Attractions 

 Educational theater at the Theater School named after Yevgeniy Yevstigneyev;
 Trade Union House;
 Former building of the Upper-Posad Chambers of Commerce;
 Museum of photography of Russian photographer Andrey Karelin;
 Dramatic Theater;
Gentry Assembly Building
 State Bank;
 Rukavishnikov's Manor House (now the Orlyonok cinema);
 The building of philological, financial faculties and the faculty of social sciences of Nizhny Novgorod State University;
 The Nizhny Novgorod Puppet Theater;
 "Art crafts" - a museum store;
 House of Communication.

Interesting

Buskers 
Every day a lot of street musicians play here. They play in different musical styles and repertoires. Some days musicians give especially large-scale street concerts with the use of professional equipment, gathering around a large number of people. Such events are often agreed in advance with the city administration.

The attitude of the city police towards street musicians is loyal. Unlike the Moscow Arbat, musicians here are not banished from the street and are not fined. If they do not violate public order.

Street artists 
Near the philological faculty of the UNN there are various artists and artisans. There's also organized an impromptu exhibition-fair of their works. The artists can be ordered portraits, caricatures and still lifes, and artisans can be ordered a variety of wicker products, pottery and more.

Sculptures 
From Minin and Pozharsky Square towards Gorky Square:
 A policeman - near the building of the exhibition complex;
 Photographer with a dog;
 "The Funny goat" - in front of the Dramatic Theater;
 Yevgeniy Yevstigneyev - on a bench near the Dramatic Theater;
 Bench of reconciliation - near the Dramatic Theater;
 Bench of the blogger - near the Dramatic Theater;
 Nikolay Dobrolyubov;
 The young violinist;
 Spouses Ivan Annenkov and Pauline Geuble;
 Servant in the tavern - inviting to enter, near the restaurant in house 35;
 Nikolay Bogolyubov - near the building of the philological faculty of the UNN;
 Spoon of taste - near the building of the philological faculty of the UNN;
 Lady with a child on a bench;
 Fashionable at the mirror - in front of the entertainment center "Oktyabr";
 Postman - Before the House of Communications, at the end of the pedestrian zone.

References

Streets in Nizhny Novgorod
Geography of Nizhny Novgorod
Pedestrian malls in Russia
Historic centre of Nizhny Novgorod